Railway Claims Tribunal is a quasi judicial body formed to determine losses against Indian Railways in case of any natural or unnatural events causings losses to the passenger or freight handled by railways.

History and objective 

Railway Claims Tribunal had been formed to calculate damages or losses against Railway Administration in the event of railway accidents and other natural and unnatural events.

Composition 

Railway Claims Tribunal is headed by chairman. Railway Claims Tribunal comprises two members, one each from Technical and Judicial. Technical member is a retired official of Indian Railways and Judicial member will be from legal background but outside railway services.

Justice (Retd) Kannan, is the chairman of Railways Claims Tribunal. He will serve for a period of five years or on attaining 65 years whichever is earlier.

Location 

Railway Claims Tribunal is located across India.

 Chandigarh
 Delhi (Headquarter)
 Jaipur
 Lucknow
 Gorakhpur
 Allahabad
 Patna
 Guwahati
 Ahmedabad
 Bhopal
 Ranchi
 Kolkata
 Mumbai
 Nagpur
 Bhubaneswar
 Secunderabad
 Amravati
 Bengaluru
 Chennai
 Ernakulum

Challenges 

 Delay in appointment of staff.

See also 

 Indian Railways

References

External links 
 Official Website

Indian Tribunals
Tribunal
Indian railways articles by importance